Footguard Hall was the headquarters and armory of the First Company Governor's Footguard of the state Connecticut, a ceremonial military company founded in 1771 and originally tasked with protecting the governor and state legislature.  The hall is located at 159 High Street, in Hartford, Connecticut, in a Romanesque Revival brick building built in 1888.  The building was listed on the National Register of Historic Places in 1984 in recognition of the organization's history and its distinctive architecture. The First Company Governor's Footguard now uses the Governor William A. O'Neill State Armory at 360 Broad Street, Hartford, Connecticut.

Description and history
Footguard Hall is located at the northwestern corner of downtown Hartford, at the northwest corner of High Street and Footguard Way.  It is a large red brick building trimmed with brownstone, Its front section is two stories in height and capped by a hip roof, with a pyramidally roofed square tower rising near the center of the front facade.  On either side of the tower are window bays with banded sash windows, set in rectangular openings on the ground floor and large rounded arches on the second.  The main entrance is at the base of the tower, with a projecting round-arch portico providing shelter.  A large assembly and drill hall extends to the rear of the front section.

The First Company Governor's Footguard was established in 1771 by the Connecticut Colony as a formal means of protecting its governor and legislature.  Members of the footguard have historically played a role in most of the nation's military conflicts, but the role they play is now largely ceremonial.  Prior to the construction of this building, the company did not have its own dedicated armory.  It was designed by the architectural firm of John C. Mead, a prominent local architect then in his last year of life.  The design was likely the work of Melvin Hapgood, who was one of Mead's principal lieutenants and took over the firm after Mead died.

The building was described at the time as the largest meeting hall between Boston and New York City, and has been used for public events.

See also
National Register of Historic Places listings in Hartford, Connecticut

References

National Register of Historic Places in Hartford, Connecticut
Romanesque Revival architecture in Connecticut
Buildings and structures completed in 1888
Buildings and structures in Hartford, Connecticut